Manzar may refer to:
 a festival in Mumbai, India; see Institute of Chemical Technology
 Manzar, Bushehr, a village in Bushehr Province, Iran
 Manzar, Nishapur, a village in Razavi Khorasan Province, Iran
 Manzar, Torbat-e Heydarieh, a village in Razavi Khorasan Province, Iran